Forge Hill is a historic home located at Wawa, Delaware County, Pennsylvania. It was built between 1798 and 1800, and is a -story, fieldstone dwelling with a -story ell added in 1936, during a complete restoration.

It was added to the National Register of Historic Places on March 7, 1973.

See also
National Register of Historic Places listings in Delaware County, Pennsylvania

References

Houses on the National Register of Historic Places in Pennsylvania
Houses completed in 1800
Houses in Delaware County, Pennsylvania
National Register of Historic Places in Delaware County, Pennsylvania